Qaderi (also transcribed variously as Qadri, Qadiri, Kadri, or Quadri) is an Arabic/Islamic surname. It is associated with the Sufi saint Abdul Qadir Gilani or the Qadiriyya founded by him.

People with the name include:

Qaderi
 Habibullah Qaderi (born 1961), Afghan Minister for Counter Narcotics
 Nazem Qaderi, Lebanese lawyer, politician, MP and government minister
 Shivan Qaderi (died 2005), Iranian murder victim

Qadri
 Qadri Jamil, Syrian politician, media editor and economist
 Abdul Hamid Qadri Badayuni (1898–1970), Pakistani Islamic scholar  
 Altaf Qadri (born 1976), Indian photojournalist
 Arshadul Qadri (1925–2002), Indian Islamic scholar associated with the Barelvi movement  
 Mohammad Badshah Qadri (1903–1978), Indian Sufi saint from Raichur  
 Ibrahim Raza Khan (1907–1965), 20th-century Indian Islamic scholar of the Barelvi movement  
 Mahir ul Qadri (1906–1978), Pakistani poet  
 Mir Suhail Qadri (born 1989), Indian political cartoonist  
 Mohiuddin Qadri Zore (1905–1962), Indian Urdu poet
 Muhammad Ilyas Qadri, Pakistani scholar of the Sunni and Sufi sect in Islam
 Muhammad Tahir-ul-Qadri (born 1951), Pakistani politician, former law professor and a Sufi scholar
 Mushtaq Qadri (1966–2002), a religious poet (na'at khawan)
Nasreen Qadri, now Nasrin Kadri (born 1986), Israeli singer of traditional and pop Middle Eastern and Mizrahi music
 Sadikshah Qadri (1918–1978), Indian Sufi saint 
 Shah Inayat Qadiri
 Shad Qadri (born 1952), Pakistani-Canadian politician and businessman
 Shahid Qadri (born 1942), Bangladeshi poet and writer
 Sohan Qadri (1932-2011), Danish yogi, poet and painter of Indian origin 
 Sayed Mehboob Shah Qadri, Indian social reformer
 Syed Shujaat Ali Qadri (1941–1993), member of the Pakistani Council of Islamic Ideology and scholar of Islamic Sciences
 Umar Al-Qadri, Islamic scholar based in Ireland
 Sayyid Shamsullah Qadri (1885–1953), Indian scholar, writer and historian
 Sayyid Ahmedullah Qadri (1909–1985), Indian journalist, writer, translator, literary critic, educationist and politician
Nasreen Qadri (born 1986), Israeli-Jewish singer
Ziaul Mustafa Razvi Qadri, Indian Islamic scholar

Kadri

Quadri
 Ameen Mian Qaudri (born 1955), Indian Sufi leader
 Syed Ahmed Pasha Quadri, Indian politician
 Samar Quadri (born 1989), Indian cricketer
 Sayeed Quadri  (born 1960), Indian lyricist and poet in Bollywood
 Syed Ahmed Quadri, Indian administrator and academic
 Syed Asif Quadri, Indian businessman
 Syed Mohammad Sharfuddin Quadri (1901–2015), Indian independence activist
 Syed Shah Mohammed Quadri (born 1938), former judge of the Supreme Court of India
 Syed Quadri, Indian domestic cricketer
 Zeishan Quadri, Indian writer, actor, director and producer

Arabic-language surnames
Qadiri order